Michael E. Carpenter (born September 3, 1947) is an American lawyer and politician from Maine. Carpenter, a Democrat, served one term (1974–1976) in the Maine House of Representatives from Houlton. In 1976, Carpenter was elected to the Maine Senate, representing southern Aroostook County. He served in that office until 1986. In 1991, the Maine Legislature elected Carpenter to the position of Maine Attorney General. He served in that office until 1995, when he was replaced by fellow Democrat Andrew Ketterer.

Carpenter is a graduate of the University of Maine School of Law.

In November 2014, Carpenter sought election to the Maine Senate to replace term-limited Republican Roger Sherman. He was defeated by former State Representative Michael Willette in the general election.

In November 2016, Carpenter again sought election to the Maine Senate (District 2). He ran against incumbent Ricky Long and won in the general election. Carpenter was re-elected in 2018.

References

1947 births
Living people
People from Houlton, Maine
Democratic Party members of the Maine House of Representatives
Democratic Party Maine state senators
Maine Attorneys General
University of Maine School of Law alumni
20th-century American politicians
21st-century American politicians